Catchfire is a 1990 American romantic action thriller film directed by Dennis Hopper and starring Jodie Foster, Hopper, Fred Ward and Vincent Price, with cameo appearances by several notable actors, including Charlie Sheen, Joe Pesci, Catherine Keener and Bob Dylan. The film was disowned by Hopper before release and he is therefore credited under the pseudonym Alan Smithee. The film underperformed at the box office and received overwhelmingly negative reviews by film critics.

In 1992, a Director's Cut of the film was released under the new title Backtrack. It runs 18 minutes longer than the theatrical version and restores Hopper's directorial credit. In additional to cable TV airings it has been released on VHS, DVD and Blu-ray. Backtrack has received important praise from specialized critics, being hailed as a total improvement over the theatrical version, while also being widely considered as Hopper's true vision of the film's story.

Plot
Conceptual artist Anne Benton (Jodie Foster) creates electronic pieces that flash evocative statements. Her work has begun to attract major media attention. Driving home one night, Anne suffers a blowout on a road near some isolated industrial factories and, while looking for help, witnesses a mafia hit supervised by Leo Carelli (Joe Pesci), who kills another mobster and his bodyguard. Leo spots Anne, but she escapes and goes to the police.

Two of the mobsters, Greek (Tony Sirico) and Pinella (John Turturro), go to Anne's house to silence her, but manage only to kill her boyfriend, Bob (Charlie Sheen). FBI agent Pauling (Fred Ward) -who's been after Carelli for some time- offers Anne a place in the United States Federal Witness Protection Program, but when she sees another mobster, Carelli's lawyer John Luponi (Dean Stockwell), at the police station, she disguises herself with another woman's wig and raincoat and flees. Meanwhile, mob boss Lino Avoca (Vincent Price), Carelli's boss, summons top-of-the-line hitman Milo (Dennis Hopper) to silence Anne. Milo purchases one of Anne's artworks and ransacks her house, discovering intimate Polaroids taken of her.

Months pass. Anne has severed all ties with her past and re-established herself in Seattle as an advertising copywriter. Milo, who never gives up, recognizes the tagline of a lipstick ad as one of Anne's catchphrases, and tracks her down. Pauling and the police also track Anne down, but she manages to once again elude all the men who are pursuing her. Shortly after, Milo tracks Anne to New Mexico. There, he is followed by Pinella, who is tracking Milo's whereabouts for Carelli, and whom Milo quickly kills. This time, Milo corners Anne and offers her a deal: he'll let her live, if she'll do anything and everything he asks. Milo's interest in Anne, it turns out, is more than professional, but not exactly what she thinks; he doesn't want her to be his sex slave, though sex is part of the equation.

A man obsessed, Milo has fallen in love with Anne. And he has no idea how to cope with the unfamiliar emotion. Astonishingly, after a rocky start, Anne realizes that she has also fallen for him. At the same time, when failing to kill Anne as he was hired to do, Milo has marked himself for death. Anne and Milo flee together to an isolated farm that Milo owns. Avoca's men track them there, and they narrowly escape.

Milo and Anne realize that in order to be free, they must return and confront their pursuers. They concoct a plan leaving Avoca, Carelli and all of their men dead. Anne and Milo escape together to a new life, presumably in France.

Alternative ending (Backtrack) 
Milo and Anne return together to the refinery by the side of the road where Anne witnessed the mob hit that made her run. The refinery in fact belongs to Mr. Avoca and bears its name. Milo contacts Leo Carelli, tells him that he killed Anne and wants to "make peace" with Carelli, whom he asks to meet in the Avoca factory. Pauling, who has a wiretap on Carelli's house, spies on the conversation and travels there with the police.

Avoca and his men wait near the factory. Pauling and the police also wait in another sector of the same zone. Carelli, his henchman Greek and Luponi go inside and find Milo waiting for them. When Luponi tries to shoot Milo in the back, Anne shoots from far away and wounds him with a scoped rifle. She reveals to be clothed in a special fire proximity suit, as well as Milo. They seem to let Carelli and Greek get away in order for them to run and trip on a wire connected to explosives. The refinery is blown to pieces, and Carelli, Greek, and Luponi die while Anne and Milo escape. Avoca sends his men after Anne and Milo but the police surround and arrest them. Nevertheless, Avoca escapes in a helicopter, and Pauling goes after Anne and Milo in his car, but misses them as they move in the sewer system nearby.

Milo and Anne move away and start a new life, presumably in France. The end credits show one of Anne's electronic signs spelling THE END in several fonts.

Cast
 Jodie Foster as Anne Benton
 Dennis Hopper as Milo
 Dean Stockwell as John Luponi
 Joe Pesci as Leo Carelli (uncredited)
 John Turturro as Pinella
 Fred Ward as Pauling
 Vincent Price as Mr. Avoca
 Julie Adams as Martha
 Tony Sirico as Greek (G. Anthony Sirico)
 Sy Richardson as Captain Walker
 Frank Gio as Frankie
 Helena Kallianiotes as Grace Carelli
 John Apicella as Man At Refinery
 Clifford Bartholomew as Fed #2
 Kevin Bourland as Ad Agency Man
 Carl David Burks as Ad Agency Man
 Grand L. Bush as Bank Teller (Grand Bush)
 Tod Davies as Hit Woman
 Satya De La Manitou as Car Thug
 Ayres Donno as Girl In Restaurant
 Tomás Goros as Golf Course Fed
 Sarina C. Grant as Hooker (Sarina Grant)
 Katherine LaNasa as The Waitress (Katherine La Nasa)
 Lauren Lloyd as Margaret Mason
 Anthony Pena as Taos Sheriff
 Robert Rothwell as Ad Agency Exec
 Jerry Summers as Rianetti
 Gary Wills as Police Sargeant
 Michael Yama as Technician
 John Zenda as Trucker

Cameos
 Catherine Keener as Trucker's Girl
 Charlie Sheen as Bob
 Burke Byrnes as Fed #1 
 Bob Dylan as Artist (uncredited)
 Alex Cox as D.H. Lawrence (uncredited)
 Toni Basil (uncredited)

Production
The production was marred with difficulties between Foster and Hopper. The differences began on the first day of filming of Foster in the shower scene. Foster, dissatisfied with the scene yelled "cut" which angered Hopper, who informed her to never do that again. Later, according to Hopper in an interview with Charlie Rose, Foster warned Meryl Streep by phone several times to avoid Hopper who was very keen on working with her. Streep never returned his calls. Hopper stated "It blew what I thought at the time was a go project a few years ago. Cause Meryl suddenly said no. She [Foster] thought that I had this AA mentality where I was really just doing this sober drunk or something."

The original screenplay was written by Rachel Kronstadt Mann, then re-written by Ann Louise Bardach, who was hired by Hopper and producer Steven Reuther. During the 1988 Writers Guild of America strike, Hopper hired Alex Cox to do another polish while the film was shooting. Hopper released a director's cut of the film in the United States on cable television titled Backtrack, which runs 18 minutes longer than the theatrical version.

Reception
The film was not well received by critics. Variety wrote: "Somewhere in here is a dark, sassy picture, but the final product is more like a jigsaw with half the pieces. Apart from Foster who's strong, shrewd and sexy, thesping is vaudeville all the way. Pesci rants and raves, Stockwell shows a nice line in a low-key comedy, Ward looks like he hasn't been shown the whole script, and Hopper has a go at Humphrey Bogart in shades". Greg Wroblewski wrote: "It's a mediocre film, with often illogical, even incomprehensible plot twists and poor character development."

References

External links

 
 
 

1990 films
1990s crime drama films
1990 action thriller films
American action thriller films
American crime drama films
1990s chase films
Films directed by Dennis Hopper
Films credited to Alan Smithee
Vestron Pictures films
1990 drama films
1990s English-language films
1990s American films